

MPs by party

This is a list of the 250 members of the 2012–2014 National Assembly of Serbia, as well as a list of former members of the 2012–2014 National Assembly.

The 2012–2014 National Assembly was elected in the 2012 parliamentary election, and it held its first session on 31 May 2012. The 2012–2014 National Assembly was the 9th assembly since the reestablishment of the multi-party system, after the 1990 parliamentary election.

List of members at the conclusion of the 9th National Assembly

List of members of the 9th National Assembly whose mandate was terminated

References

2012